Jim Courier was the defending champion but lost in the second round to Grant Stafford.

Pete Sampras won in the final 5–7, 7–6(7–4), 6–3 against Patrick Rafter.

Seeds
A champion seed is indicated in bold text while text in italics indicates the round in which that seed was eliminated.

  Pete Sampras (champion)
  Jim Courier (second round)
  Paul Haarhuis (second round)
  Richey Reneberg (withdrew — bruised hip muscle)  
  Jason Stoltenberg (first round)
  Todd Woodbridge (second round)
  Alex O'Brien (first round)
  Greg Rusedski (first round)

Draw

Finals

Top half

Bottom half

References

External links
 1997 Advanta Championships Draw

U.S. Pro Indoor
1997 ATP Tour